is a Japanese advertising agency and, since March 2020, a subsidiary of Bandai Namco Holdings, having substantial relations with it before the acquisition, especially with its now-corporate sibling, Sunrise.

History
The agency was first listed in the JASDAQ stock exchange in 2003.

It has been involved in the production and licensing of numerous television programs, beginning in 1972 with  Thunder Mask. The first anime series it produced was Sunrise's Invincible Super Man Zambot 3, after which the company produced numerous others. In 1979, it produced Mobile Suit Gundam.

In October 2019, Bandai Namco Holdings announced plans to acquire Sotsu, a move which would grant the company rights to the entire Gundam franchise. The next month, however, Chicago, Illinois-based investment firm RMB Capital forced Bandai Namco to raise the tender offer price for Sotsu in a follow-on tender offer targeted at the general shareholders of Sotsu. On March 1, 2020, Sotsu finally became a fully owned subsidiary of Bandai Namco.

Productions

Sunrise productions
Aura Battler Dunbine
Combat Mecha Xabungle
Gundam series
Haou Taikei Ryū Knight
Heavy Metal L-Gaim
Invincible Steel Man Daitarn 3
Invincible Super Man Zambot 3
Wild Knights Gulkeeva
Metal Armor Dragonar
Outlaw Star
Saikyō Robo Daiōja
Shippu! Iron Leaguer
Trider G7

Nippon TV programs
Sore Ike! Anpanman
Thunder Mask

TV Asahi/ABC programs
Burst Angel
Gankutsuou: The Count of Monte Cristo
Glass no Kantai
SoltyRei
Speed Grapher

TV Tokyo programs
Battle Hawk (as Toyo Agency)
Cardfight Vanguard (formerly aired on TV Aichi for the first season)
Capeta
Dai-Guard
E's Otherwise
Earth Girl Arjuna
Eat-Man (1997 anime)
Eden's Bowy
Elemental Gelade
Glass no Kamen
Grander Musashi RV
Hare+Guu
Hyper Police
Kinkyū Hasshin Saver Kids
Legend of Heavenly Sphere Shurato
Doki Doki Densetsu Mahōjin Guru Guru
Master of Mosquiton ('99)
Papuwa
Saber Marionette J
Kyatto Ninden Teyandee
School Rumble
Shadow Skill
Shiawa Sesō no Okojo-san
Shura no Toki
Silent Mobius
Simoun
Sorcerer Hunters
Spiral: Suiri no Kizuna
Tekkaman Blade
Shin Tenchi Muyo!
Those Who Hunt Elves
Virus Buster Serge
YuruYuri

UHF programs
Higurashi no Naku Koro Ni
Play Ball
Shōnen Onmyōji

Source:

Notes

References

External links
 

Bandai Namco Holdings subsidiaries
Advertising agencies of Japan
Mass media companies based in Tokyo
Service companies based in Tokyo
Japanese companies established in 1965
Mass media companies established in 1965
2020 mergers and acquisitions